John Champion may refer to:

John C. Champion (1923–1994), American producer and screenwriter
John George Champion (1815–1854), English soldier, botanist, and explorer
Jon Champion (born 1965), English association football commentator